John Dinn , is a Canadian politician in Newfoundland and Labrador, Canada. He represented the district of Kilbride in the Newfoundland and Labrador House of Assembly from 2007 to 2015 as a member of the Progressive Conservative Party. From 1992 until 2005 Dinn represented Ward 5 on the St. John's City Council.

Electoral record

|-

|-
 
|NDP
|Paul Boundridge
|align="right"|1,927
|align="right"|33.64%
|align="right"|
|-

|}

|-

|-

|NDP
|Michelle Broderick
|align="right"|421
|align="right"|8.01%
|align="right"|
|-

|-

|Independent
|Paul Perrier
|align="right"|31
|align="right"|0.59%
|align="right"|
|}

 
|PC
|John Dinn
|align="right"|2,744
|align="right"|78.83
|align="right"|+0.55
|-

|-

| style="width: 130px" |NDP
|Gemma Schlamp-Hickey
|align="right"|229
|align="right"|6.58
|align="right"|+0.63
|- bgcolor="white"
!align="left" colspan=3|Total
!align="right"|3,481
!align="right"|100%
!align="right"|
|}

References

External links
 John Dinn's PC Party biography

Progressive Conservative Party of Newfoundland and Labrador MHAs
Living people
St. John's, Newfoundland and Labrador city councillors
21st-century Canadian politicians
Year of birth missing (living people)